The Tupelo Buffalo Park and Zoo is a zoo located in Tupelo, Mississippi. At , it is the largest zoo in the state of Mississippi.

History
The Tupelo Buffalo Park and Zoo was founded by Dan Franklin and is located at 2272 North Coley Road.

Buffalo
A large herd of American bison roam the park. Modified school buses with large, off-road tires take visitors into the park to see the herd.

Rare white buffalo
The Buffalo Park was home to Tukota, a rare white bison, not an albino. There are several great legends by the Sioux tribes explaining the creation and the infrequent occurrence of the white buffalo. A white buffalo is so rare in fact that they only occur one time in five million births. Tukota was born at the park. This made "Tukota" one of the more special animals at the Tupelo Buffalo Park and Zoo. His name was the winning submission from Mrs. Mills' 4th Grade class at Rankin Elementary School in 2002. Tukota died in early 2012 due to a fight with another buffalo in the park. His injuries were life-threatening, thus the decision was made to euthanize the rare animal.

Animals

Attractions

External links 

Year of establishment missing
Zoos in Mississippi
Protected areas of Lee County, Mississippi
Tourist attractions in Lee County, Mississippi
Landmarks in Mississippi
Buildings and structures in Tupelo, Mississippi